The Riparius Bridge is a two lane truss bridge that carries New York State Route 8 across the Hudson River connecting Johnsburg, New York with Chestertown, New York.  It was built in 2003, replacing a similar style camelback truss bridge that had been built in 1919.  The new bridge was built to better accommodate vehicles, bicycles, and pedestrians.

See also
List of fixed crossings of the Hudson River

References

Bridges over the Hudson River
Bridges completed in 2003
Road bridges in New York (state)
Steel bridges in the United States
Parker truss bridges in the United States
Transportation buildings and structures in Warren County, New York